Nemescsó ( Croatian and ) is a village in Vas county, Hungary.

Notable people 

 Miklós Takács de Saár, silviculturist, politician

References

Populated places in Vas County